Harold Francis "Lal" McLennan (26 July 1888 – 20 September 1978) was an Australian rules footballer who played with Fitzroy in the Victorian Football League (VFL).

McLennan was a centreman and captained Fitzroy in the 1911 season. In both 1912 and 1913 he was Fitzroy's Club Champion, the latter in a premiership side. He was a premiership winner again in 1916.

References

External links 

 
 
 

1888 births
Australian rules footballers from Victoria (Australia)
Mitchell Medal winners
Fitzroy Football Club players
Fitzroy Football Club Premiership players
1978 deaths
Two-time VFL/AFL Premiership players